Ghar Wapsi (Hindi, meaning "Returning Home") is the programme of religious conversion to Hinduism and Sikhism from Islam, Christianity and other religions, conducted by Indian Hindu nationalist organisations Vishva Hindu Parishad (VHP), Rashtriya Swayamsevak Sangh (RSS) and their allies. The term owes to the Hindu nationalist ideology that all people of India are ancestrally Hindu and, hence, conversion to Hinduism is one of "returning home" to their ancestral roots.

The programme became a subject of public discussion in 2014. The Bharatiya Janata Party's Yogi Adityanath has claimed this campaign would continue unless conversions to other religions are banned altogether in the country. According to proponents of Hindutva, such as Sangh Parivar, the process is called "reconversion" of Christians and Muslims who were previously converted. The process is viewed as Shuddhi or "purification" rather than conversion, since they state, through Ghar Wapsi, people from the other religions are returning to their "true" religion.

The Vishva Hindu Parishad and the Rashtriya Swayamsevak Sangh organised several Ghar Wapsi events in Telangana, Andhra Pradesh, Kerala, and Goa. The Indian Express reported that Scheduled Caste Manjhi families demanded better facilities along with education and healthcare before they converted.

In a Supreme Court judgment, the judges ruled that reconversion to Hinduism will not prevent a person from accessing quota benefits and adopt the caste of his forefathers. The bench further held that "the Scheduled Caste persons belonging to Hindu religion, who had embraced Christianity with some kind of hope or aspiration, have remained socially, educationally and economically backward."

Etymology 
The word ghar is of Hindi origin which means "home". The word wapsi is of Persian origin which means "to return".

This term indicates the belief held by the organisations facilitating such programmes that most of the Muslims and Christians in India have descended from Hindus, and hence are returning to their "home" through reconversion.

Historical precedence
There have been multiple cases of individuals and communities applying for reconversion into their old faith. Kulkarni has given instances of reconversion in Maharashtra region from early modern times. He claims that there was also reluctance on Hindu society of that period to accept people back into the fold but upon pressure from rulers such as Shivaji, the reconversion was allowed. More serious objections were raised when a community desired to return to their Hindu caste after many generations. During Shivaji's rule a group of Panchkalshi converts wanted to return, however the caste council (Got sabha) raised objections and Shivaji and later Sambhaji had to postpone decision on the matter. The rules on reconversion became tighter under Peshwa rule in mid and late 1700s.

Major instances

Telangana and Andhra Pradesh
More than 8,000 people in Telangana and Andhra Pradesh converted to Hinduism from July 2014 - December 2014 under the Ghar Wapsi programme. According to a VHP official, 1,200 people converted to Hinduism in a Ghar Wapsi event in Hyderabad. In October 2019, 500 Christian Dalits in Andhra Pradesh were convinced to become Hindu and promise to never go to church again.

Jharkhand
In April 2017, at least 53 tribal Christian families converted to Hinduism as part of the RSS's "Christianity-free" block campaign in Arki, Jharkhand. And at least seven other Christian families underwent a Shuddhikaran (purification ceremony) in Kochasindhri village.

In March 2021, 181 Christians in Garhwa district were converted to the tribal Sarna religion.

Punjab
Between 2011 and 2014, about 8,000 Christians in Punjab were converted back to Sikhism. Most of the reconversion was done in the Hoshiarpur district, followed by Amritsar and Batala.

In September 2022, about 500 Christians reconverted to Sikhism in the Amritsar district. 56 families were reconverted to Sikhism from Christianity in the border area villages of Punjab.

West Bengal
More than 100 tribal Christians were converted to Hinduism in the West Bengal's Birbhum district.

On 15 February 2018 an Organisation called Hindu Samhati led by Tapan Ghosh organized “Ghar Wapsi” with 16 members of a Muslim family, who had “been re-converted to Hinduism”, being showcased on the dais of rightwing outfit Hindu Samhati.

Uttar Pradesh
During Agra religious conversions 2014, it was claimed that 100 – 250 Muslims converted to Hinduism. In May 2017, RSS performed conversion of at least 22 Muslims, including women and children, into Hinduism in a secretive ceremony at an Arya samaj Temple in Ambedkar Nagar district of Faizabad, Uttar Pradesh.

In Bulandshahr On 25 December 2022, More than 100 Christians reconverted to Hinduism.

Tripura
In January 2019, 96 Tribal families that converted to Christianity 9 years prior, underwent Ghar Wapsi to reconvert back to Hinduism. The event took place in Kailashahar in Unakoti district in Tripura. The event was done by the Hindu Jagaran Mancham, an affiliate of the RSS, and the Vishwa Hindu Parishad (VHP).

Kerala
In 2015, about 35 people were reportedly converted to Hinduism at an event organised by the Vishwa Hindu Parishad (VHP) in Alappuzha. In 2015, 35 people converted to Hinduism in Kottayam district. They were Dalit families who had converted to Christianity a few generations back.

In 2021, 209 Christians converted to Hinduism, while 32 Muslims converted to Hinduism.

Tamil Nadu
In 2015, first ghar wapsi happened in Tamil Nadu where 18 Dalit Christians reconverted to Hinduism by a ceremony done by the Hindu Makkal Katchi.

Gujarat
In 2020, 144 tribal Hindus who converted to Christianity many years ago converted back to Hinduism in Dang district, Gujarat by the Agniveer organisation.

Chhattisgarh
In 2021, 1,200 people were reconverted to Hinduism from Christianity in Chhattisgarh's Jashpur.

In January 2023, 1100 people were converted to Hinduism from Christianity in the presence of BJP's Chhattisgarh state minister Prabal Pratap Singh Judev

Reception
Secular groups and political parties are critical of Ghar Wapsi, when it is done with the state's support, as they say that it threatens freedom of religion in the country.

See also

 Shuddhi
 Dayanand Saraswati
 Swami Shraddhanand
 Agra religious conversions 2014
 Love Jihad
 Netaji Palkar
 Bukka Raya I

References

Further reading

External links
 The politics of othering, Charu Gupta, Indian Express, 20 December 2014.
 Ghar Vapsi: Civil society needs to challenge RSS's conversion agenda, Firstpost, 14 December 2014
 'Reconversion' Paradoxes, Christopher Jaffrelot, Indian Express, 7 January 2015
 r/GharWapsi, Ghar Wapsi Subreddit

Religious conversion in India
Vishva Hindu Parishad
Rashtriya Swayamsevak Sangh
Hindutva
Hinduism-related controversies